Margerine Eclipse is the eighth studio album by English-French rock band Stereolab. It was released on 27 January 2004 in the United States by Elektra Records and on 2 February 2004 in the United Kingdom by Duophonic Records. The album is in large part a eulogy to former band member Mary Hansen, who died in 2002.

By June 2004, Margerine Eclipse had sold over 40,000 copies in United States. A remastered and expanded edition of the album was released by Duophonic and Warp on 29 November 2019.

Background
In December 2002, Stereolab member Mary Hansen was killed in a cycling accident. The band subsequently dedicated Margerine Eclipse to Hansen, with the lyrics of the song "Feel and Triple" making specific reference to her. Shortly before work commenced on the album, band members Tim Gane and Lætitia Sadier ended their romantic relationship. Their breakup is alluded to in Sadier's lyrics for the song "Hillbilly Motobike".

Margerine Eclipse was mixed with full stereo separation – or as Stereolab termed it, in "dual mono". For every song, the band made two recordings – each with a different arrangement – then created a final mix by synchronising both recordings together, with one on the left channel and the other on the right channel. The technique was also used on the band's 2003 EP Instant 0 in the Universe.

Track listing

Personnel
Credits are adapted from the album's liner notes.

Stereolab
 Tim Gane – electric guitar, electronics, organ
 Lætitia Sadier – vocals, trombone on "Margerine Melodie"
 Dominic Jeffery – organ, electric piano, harpsichord, celeste
 Simon Johns – bass, drums on "Margerine Rock"
 Andy Ramsay – drums, drum machine

Additional musicians
 Fulton Dingley – drum machine, synthesizer, MIDI, percussion
 Sean O'Hagan – keyboards, acoustic and electric guitars, other instruments
 Jan St. Werner – electronics on "Vonal Declosion" and "Feel and Triple"

Production
 Fulton Dingley – engineering, mixing
 Stereolab (credited as "The Groop") – mixing

Charts

References

External links
 Margerine Eclipse at official Stereolab website
 
 

2004 albums
Stereolab albums
Elektra Records albums